The A Lyga is highest level of men's volleyball club tournament in Lithuania.

History 

From 1935 to 1943 Volleyball Championships of Kaunas City was held. First national-wide championships were held in 1947. Teams from Vilnius won the most titles.

Teams

References

External links 
 Lithuanian Volleyball Federation

Lithuania
Volleyball leagues in Lithuania
Sports leagues established in 1947